Piedmont Natural Gas Company, Inc. is a wholly owned subsidiary of Duke Energy. Piedmont is an energy services company whose principal business is the distribution of natural gas to over one million residential, commercial, industrial and power generation customers in portions of North Carolina, South Carolina and Tennessee, including customers served by municipalities who are their wholesale customers. They are invested in joint venture, energy-related businesses, including regulated interstate natural gas transportation and storage and regulated intrastate natural gas transportation businesses. In 2013, the company was awarded as a Platinum-level Start! Fit-Friendly Company by the American Heart Association for the fifth consecutive year. The award is the highest level of recognition in AHA's Start! Program and it is bestowed to Piedmont for its high quality working environment and well-being for its staff.

History

The company was incorporated in New York in 1950 and began operations in 1951. In 1994, it merged into a newly formed North Carolina corporation with the same name to move its business to North Carolina.

The company was acquired by Duke Energy on October 3, 2016.

References

External links
 

Natural gas companies of the United States
Energy in North Carolina
Companies based in North Carolina
Energy companies established in 1949
Non-renewable resource companies established in 1949